Dalj is a village on the Danube in eastern Croatia, near the confluence of the Drava and Danube, on the border with Serbia. It is located on the D519 road, south of its intersection with the D213 road and the Vukovar–Erdut railway.

Administratively it is a part of the municipality of Erdut, Osijek-Baranja County. Although the namesake of the municipality is Erdut, Dalj is the largest settlement of the municipality and its administrative, cultural and economic center.

History

Prehistory
One Scordisci archaeological site in Dalj dating back to late La Tène culture was excavated in the 1970s and 1980s as a part of rescue excavations in eastern Croatia. Archaeological site was a part of the settlement network of Scordisci in the area of Vinkovci.

Croatian War of Independence
During the Croatian War of Independence, the village became the site of the Dalj massacre - killing of 39 prisoners of war in August 1991. The prisoners were captured as Croatian policemen, Croatian National Guard troops and Civil defencemen and killed after the Yugoslav People's Army and Serbian paramilitaries captured Dalj on 1 August. Goran Hadžić, Croatian Serb political leader at the time, was charged with war crimes by the International Criminal Tribunal for the former Yugoslavia (ICTY) in relation to these atrocities.

The ICTY also charged Hadžić with illegal detention of hundreds of civilians in Dalj police station and a hangar near village's railway station. The detainees were beaten and otherwise physically abused. After Hadžić was diagnosed with a terminal illness, his trial was discontinued in 2015. He died in July 2016.

Demographics

According to the 2011 census the Erdut municipality (part of which is Dalj) has a population of 7,308. The municipal population consists of Serbs (55.56%), Croats (37.96%) and Hungarians (5.06%).

Education

Secondary

Dalj High School is public high school in Dalj. School offers students the following educational programs: Economist, Commercial Officer (in Serbian), Agricultural Technician and Agricultural Technician General.

Notable natives and residents
 Jovan Isailović Jr., 19th century painter
 Milutin Milanković, Serbian scientist
 Vasilije Trbić, Serbian Chetnik commander
 Časlav Ocić, Serbian economist and academician
 Danica Tomić, the first woman pilot in Yugoslavia

See also
Erdut
Cultural and Scientific Center "Milutin Milanković"
Dalj High School
Church of St. Demetrius, Dalj
Dalj massacre

References

Populated places in Osijek-Baranja County
Joint Council of Municipalities
Populated places on the Danube
Serb communities in Croatia
Croatia–Serbia border
Archaeological sites in Croatia
La Tène culture